Montas may refer to:

Montas Antoine (born 1926), Haitian painter
Frankie Montas (born 1993), Dominican baseball player
Juan Temístocles Montás (born 1950), Minister of Economy, Planning and Development of the Dominican Republic, economist and academic
Michèle Montas (born 1946), Haitian journalist and former United Nations spokesperson

See also
Monta, a given name